Iain Macleod (1913–1970) was a British politician.

Iain MacLeod or Macleod may also refer to:
Iain Macleod (lawyer), British lawyer
Iain Borb MacLeod (1392–1442), Scottish clan chief
Iain Finlay Macleod (born 1973), Scottish writer
Ian R. MacLeod (born 1956), British science fiction and fantasy author
Iain Ciar MacLeod (1330 – ), considered to be fourth chief of Clan MacLeod
Ian Macleod Distillers, owner of the Scotch whisky distilleries Glengoyne and Tamdhu.

See also
 Ian McLeod (disambiguation)